Manny & Lo is a 1996 comedy-drama film directed by Lisa Krueger and starring Scarlett Johansson, Aleksa Palladino, and Mary Kay Place.

Synopsis
Two sisters, 11-year-old Amanda (nicknamed Manny) and 16-year-old Laurel (nicknamed Lo), run away from several foster homes, sleeping wherever they can, including in model homes. But when Lo becomes pregnant, the two find that they can't make it through this crisis on their own. With nowhere else to turn, they decided to kidnap Elaine, a clerk at a baby supply store. But it seems that Elaine just may need Manny and Lo as much as they need her.

Cast
 Scarlett Johansson as Manny
 Aleksa Palladino as Lo
 Mary Kay Place as Elaine
 Dean Silvers as Suburban Family
 Marlen Hecht as Suburban Family
 Forrest Silvers as Suburban Family
 Tyler Silvers as Suburban Family
 Lisa Campion as Convenience Store Clerk
 Glenn Fitzgerald as Joey
 Novella Nelson as Georgine
 Susan Decker as Baby Store Customer #1
 Marla Zuk as Baby Store Customer #2
 Bonnie Johnson as Baby Store Customer #3
 Melissa Johnson as Child
 Angie Phillips as Connie
 Cameron Boyd as Chuck
 Paul Guilfoyle as Country House Owner
 Tony Arnaud as Sheriff
 Nicholas Lent as Lo's Baby

Reception
As of June 2022, Manny and Lo holds a rating of 59% on Rotten Tomatoes based on 22 reviews.

References

External links
 
 
 

1996 films
1996 comedy-drama films
American comedy-drama films
Teenage pregnancy in film
American pregnancy films
American independent films
Films about runaways
1996 independent films
Films about sisters
1990s English-language films
1990s American films